Isola del Liri (simply known as Isola Liri,) is an Italian town of Lazio, Italy, in the province of Frosinone. As its name implies, Isola is situated between two arms of the Liri. The many waterfalls of this river and of the Fibreno are used by factories.

History
Of Volscan origin, after the fall of the Western Roman Empire Isola del Liri was ruled by the Byzantines and then the Lombards. 

In the early Middle Ages the town was, alternatively, under the rule of the Byzantines and the Lombards, until it became part of the county of Sora in the Principality of Capua. Isola del Liri was the feud of the dell'Isola (de Insulae) family from the 12th  century to the 14th century. Members of the family include Roffredo dell'Isola, Abbot of Monte Cassino, Count d'Arce, and Bartholomew dell'Isola who enjoyed the honors in the seat of Capuano Naples. At the end of the 14th century, Isola del Liri was ceded to the Cantelmo family.

Later it was part of the Duchy of Sora, becoming a ducal seat under the Boncompagni family. In 1796 it was annexed to the Papal States.

It was once in the old Terra di Lavoro region of Campania, but was transferred to the Lazio during the Fascist period.

Main sights
It is mentioned for the first time in 1100. After the acquisition of the Duchy of Sora by the della Rovere family, it became one of their main residences. It was also housed by their successors as dukes, the Boncompagni; in the 17th century Costanza Sforza turned into a luxurious palace, with biblica frescoes and basreliefs of the duchy's lands, as well as a garden.

Culture

Isola del Liri is the seat of the eponymous blues festival since 1988.
Liri Blues is an international festival has been free ever since its first year. Liri Blues is an event that happens every year during a week in July. Concerts are held in the main square (Piazza Boncompagni), in the streets and jam sessions happen late at night.

In 1997, for the 10th edition of the festival, the town of Isola del Liri signed a twinning with the city of
New Orleans (Louisiana, USA).

Twin towns

 New Orleans, United States

References

Sources

See also

Liri Blues Festival
Province of Frosinone
Liri
Eustachio Pisani

Cities and towns in Lazio
Castles in Italy